Bambouti is a sub-prefecture of Haut-Mbomou in the Central African Republic.

Geography 
It is located on the RN2 national road 110 km east of the capital of Haut-Mbomou: Obo, near the border between the Central African Republic and South Sudan.

History 
On May 2, 2002, the locality is erected in chief town of sub-prefecture of Haut-Mbomou, by the separation of the eastern part of the sub-prefecture of Obo.At the end of 2015, the locality receives refugees from South Sudan, nearby.

Central African Republic Civil War (2012-present) 
In October 2019 armed group Union for Peace in the Central African Republic took control of Bambouti. Later, the Lord's Resistance Army took control of the area.

On 8 November 2020, in response to UPC incursion into South Sudan territories, an armed group from South Sudan led by James Nando Mark attacked Bambouti and killed two UPC members. Afterward, the armed group withdrew to South Sudan and UPC regained control of the town. In response to the attack, UPC kidnapped Bambouti's mayor.

On 15 March 2023, a self-defense militia group named Azande Ani KPI GBE captured Bambouti from UPC rebels. As a result, UPC withdrew to a place not far from the town.

References 

Sub-prefectures of the Central African Republic
Populated places in Haut-Mbomou